"Hard Habit to Break" is a song written by Steve Kipner and John Lewis Parker, produced and arranged by David Foster and recorded by the group Chicago for their 1984 album Chicago 17, with Bill Champlin and Peter Cetera sharing lead vocals. Released as the second single from the album, it reached  on the Billboard Hot 100 and was prevented from charting higher by "Caribbean Queen" by Billy Ocean and "I Just Called to Say I Love You" by Stevie Wonder.

"Hard Habit to Break" was nominated for four Grammy Awards: Foster and Jeremy Lubbock won the award for Best Instrumental Arrangement Accompanying Vocal(s); Chicago were nominated for the song in the categories Record of the Year and Best Pop Performance by a Duo or Group with Vocal; and Cetera and Foster were nominated for Best Vocal Arrangement for Two or More Voices. Songwriters Kipner and Parker won an ASCAP award in 1986 for most-performed song.

The song's title was used as the slogan for Demon Dogs, a hot dog stand owned by the band's manager Peter Schivarelli which was located in the area of DePaul University's Lincoln Park campus.

Critical reception
In 2020, music reviewer Perplexio on the website Something Else! labeled "Hard Habit to Break" a "pop masterpiece" and gave it a rating of a "perfect 10", calling the pairing of the voices of Cetera and Champlin "lightning-in-a-bottle vocal chemistry."

Charts

Personnel 
Chicago
 Peter Cetera – lead and backing vocals
 Bill Champlin – keyboards, lead and backing vocals
 Robert Lamm – backing vocals
 Lee Loughnane – trumpet
 James Pankow – trombone, horn arrangements
 Walter Parazaider – woodwinds
 Danny Seraphine – drums

Additional personnel
 David Foster – keyboards, synth bass, synthesizer programming, rhythm and vocal arrangements
 John Van Tongeren – synthesizer programming
 Erich Bulling – synthesizer programming
 Marcus Ryle – synthesizer programming
 Michael Landau – guitar
 Paul Jackson, Jr. – guitar
 Paulinho da Costa – percussion
 Gary Grant – trumpet
 Greg Adams – trumpet
 David Foster and Jeremy Lubbock – orchestration

Cover versions
Puerto Rican singer Glenn Monroig recorded a Spanish-language cover version entitled "El Vicio Que No Puedo Romper" for his album Apasionado (1986). All-4-One also recorded a cover version on their compilation album Greatest Hits (2004).

References

1984 songs
1984 singles
Chicago (band) songs
Songs written by Steve Kipner
Song recordings produced by David Foster
Warner Records singles
Grammy Award for Best Instrumental Arrangement Accompanying Vocalist(s)
Full Moon Records singles
Rock ballads